Shezhou or She Prefecture was a zhou (prefecture) in imperial China centering on modern She County, Anhui, China. It existed (intermittently) between 589 and 1121, the latter being the year the Song dynasty terminated the major rebellion led by Fang La in Shezhou.

References
 

Prefectures of the Sui dynasty
Prefectures of the Tang dynasty
Prefectures of Yang Wu
Prefectures of Southern Tang
Prefectures of the Song dynasty
Former prefectures in Anhui
Former prefectures in Jiangxi